La Voz de Galicia is a Spanish daily newspaper owned by the Corporación Voz de Galicia. La Voz is highest circulation newspaper in Galicia and the eighth-highest circulation general-interest daily newspaper in Spain. It is written primarily in Spanish with Galician used in the cultural and opinion sections.

The newspaper was founded in 1882 by Juan Fernández Latorre and is published in A Coruña, Galicia.

The paper has a digital version available in Spanish and Galician, however the Galician version is an automatic translation, the original articles are written exclusively in Spanish.

History
Juan Fernández Latorre founded La Voz de Galicia in 1882 as a republican, progressive newspaper. Consolidated in the republican era with a circulation of more than 20.000 daily copies, it was not until the 1960s, when Santiago Rey Fernandez-Latorre, the founder's grandson took over as manager, that La Voz began its expansion.

In May 2010, La Voz started a Digital Terrestrial Television station V Televisión. The Fundación Santiago Rey Fernández-Latorre manages, besides the museum, the programs of Voz Natura and Prensa-Escuela.

In 1993 the circulation of La Voz was 107,446 copies. The paper had a circulation of 111,000 copies in 2003. The 2008 circulation of the paper was 103,341 copies. It was 94,844 copies in 2011.

Political allegiance
Like the majority of Galician newspapers, La Voz de Galicia relies on regional government subsidies for its survival, heavily compromising its editorial independence.  Following the 2009 Galician parliamentary elections in which the center-right People's Party of Galicia defeated the center-left Spanish Socialist Workers' Party-Bloque Nacionalista Galego coalition, the newspaper was awarded more than 4 million euros in subsidies. Other Galician media, like the defunct newspaper Xornal de Galicia, born to compete with La Voz de Galicia, claimed that this was reward for its political bias towards the ruling People's Party. This kept the paper alive, while other media disappeared because they lacked the financial support that they were entitled to as Galician language papers (the Spanish government provides extra funding to regions with several official languages in order to support their promotion).

Editions
The newspaper publishes 14 editions every day, carried out by journalists from 26 different areas and resources (branch offices, sub-branches and correspondents) which allows the reader to obtain the closest information on everyday reality. Each edition is singled out by an insert within the newspaper which gathers all local information, a specific first page for each area and targeted information within the main body of the newspaper, specially in the sports section. This personalization implies the production of nearly 400 daily pages processed by the editorial staff and the printing department, of these the reader gets to see an average of 96 pages in his local edition.

With the opening of the Ferrol branch office in 1953, La Voz de Galicia was the first newspaper to undertake this editorial system which served as model to other newspapers outside Galicia. From that moment on, the expansion was carried out in various phases. In 1959 the Santiago branch was opened, in 1964 the one in Carballo and so on up to 1978, when the seven Galician cities had their own local editorial office. By 1990 the other main regions were also covered and short after the editorial staff office in Madrid was inaugurated, city that has a numerous Galician population.

This territorial organization allows La Voz de Galicia to have representatives in these areas in order to meet the necessities and interests of each city and region: the delegates are who manage the manpower appointed to each branch office and who defend the interests of the Corporación Voz and its readers.

La Voz has also a weekly supplement, Golfiño.

References

External links

 Official website

1882 establishments in Spain
Mass media in Galicia (Spain)
Mass media in A Coruña
Daily newspapers published in Spain
Publications established in 1882
Spanish-language newspapers
Spanish news websites